Vinaichandra Guduguntla Venkatesham is a British-Indian football administrator. He serves as the Chief Executive of Arsenal Football Club since 2020.

Life and career
An employee of Arsenal F.C. since 2010 in a variety of roles,  he was appointed Managing Director to replace the outgoing Ivan Gazidis. Immediately before the promotion, he was the chief commercial officer. Venkatesham is of Indian origin. He worked on London 2012 prior to joining Arsenal, and is currently a non-executive director of the British Olympic Association.

References

Living people
Year of birth missing (living people)
Place of birth missing (living people)
Arsenal F.C. directors and chairmen
British people of Indian descent